Ebola vaccines are vaccines either approved or in development to prevent Ebola. As of 2022, there are only vaccines against the Zaire ebolavirus. The first vaccine to be approved in the United States was rVSV-ZEBOV in December 2019. It had been used extensively in the Kivu Ebola epidemic under a compassionate use protocol. During the early 21st century, several vaccine candidates displayed efficacy to protect nonhuman primates (usually macaques) against lethal infection.

Vaccines include replication-deficient adenovirus vectors, replication-competent vesicular stomatitis (VSV) and human parainfluenza (HPIV-3) vectors, and virus-like nanoparticle preparations. Conventional trials to study efficacy by exposure of humans to the pathogen after immunization are not ethical in this case. For such situations, the US Food and Drug Administration (FDA) has established the "animal efficacy rule" allowing licensure to be approved on the basis of animal model studies that replicate human disease, combined with evidence of safety and a potentially potent immune response (antibodies in the blood) from humans given the vaccine. Clinical trials involve the administration of the vaccine to healthy human subjects to evaluate the immune response, identify any side effects and determine the appropriate dosage.

Approved

rVSV-ZEBOV 

VSV-EBOV or rVSV-ZEBOV, sold under the brand name Ervebo, is a vaccine based on the vesicular stomatitis virus which was genetically modified to express a surface glycoprotein of Zaire Ebola virus. In November 2019, the European Commission granted a conditional marketing authorization. The WHO prequalification came fewer than 48 hours later, making it the fastest vaccine prequalification process ever conducted by WHO. It was approved for medical use in the European Union in November 2019. It was approved for medical use in the United States in December 2019.

The most common side effects include pain, swelling and redness at the injection site, headache, fever, muscle pain, tiredness and joint pain. In general, these reactions occur within seven days after vaccination, are mild to moderate in intensity and resolved in less than a week.

It was developed by the Public Health Agency of Canada, with development subsequently taken over by Merck Inc. In October 2014, the Wellcome Trust, who was also one of the biggest UK founders, announced the start of multiple trials in healthy volunteers in Europe, Gabon, Kenya, and the US. The vaccine was proven safe at multiple sites in North America, Europe, and Africa, but several volunteers at one trial site in Geneva, Switzerland, developed vaccine-related arthritis after about two weeks, and about 20–30% of volunteers at reporting sites developed low-grade post-vaccine fever, which resolved within a day or two. Other common side-effects were pain at the site of injection, myalgia, and fatigue. The trial was temporarily halted in December 2014 due to possible adverse effects, but subsequently resumed. , a Phase III trial with a single dose of VSV-EBOV began in Liberia after a successful Phase II study in the West African country. On 31 July 2015, preliminary results of a Phase III trial in Guinea indicated that the vaccine appeared to be "highly efficacious and safe." The trial used a ring vaccination protocol that first vaccinated all the closest contacts of new cases of Ebola infection either immediately or after 21 days. Because of the demonstrated efficacy of immediate vaccination, all recipients will now be immunized immediately. Ring vaccination is the method used in the program to eradicate smallpox in the 1970s. The trial will continue to assess whether the vaccine is effective in creating herd immunity to Ebola virus infection. In December 2016, a study found the VSV-EBOV vaccine to be 95–100% effective against the Ebola virus, making it the first proven vaccine against the disease.

The approval was supported by a study conducted in Guinea during the 2014–2016 outbreak in individuals 18 years of age and older. The study was a randomized cluster (ring) vaccination study in which 3,537 contacts, and contacts of contacts, of individuals with laboratory-confirmed Ebola virus disease (EVD) received either "immediate" or 21-day "delayed" vaccination. This design was intended to capture a social network of individuals and locations that might include dwellings or workplaces where a patient spent time while symptomatic, or the households of individuals who had contact with the patient during that person's illness or death. In a comparison of cases of EVD among 2,108 individuals in the "immediate" vaccination arm and 1,429 individuals in the "delayed" vaccination arm, Ervebo was determined to be 100% effective in preventing Ebola cases with symptom onset greater than ten days after vaccination. No cases of EVD with symptom onset greater than ten days after vaccination were observed in the "immediate" cluster group, compared with ten cases of EVD in the 21-day "delayed" cluster group.

In additional studies, antibody responses were assessed in 477 individuals in Liberia, some 500 individuals in Sierra Leone, and about 900 individuals in Canada, Spain, and the US. The antibody responses among those in the study conducted in Canada, Spain and the US were similar to those among individuals in the studies conducted in Liberia and Sierra Leone.

The safety was assessed in approximately 15,000 individuals in Africa, Europe, and North America. The most commonly reported side effects were pain, swelling and redness at the injection site, as well as headache, fever, joint and muscle aches and fatigue.

In December 2016, a study found the VSV-EBOV vaccine to be 70–100% effective against the Ebola virus, making it the first proven vaccine against the disease. However, the design of this study and the high efficacy of the vaccine were questioned. In November 2019, the European Commission granted a conditional marketing authorization to Ervebo (rVSV∆G-ZEBOV-GP, live) and the WHO prequalified an Ebola vaccine for the first time.

Zabdeno/Mvabea 
The two-dose regimen of Ad26.ZEBOV and MVA-BN-Filo, sold under the brand names Zabdeno and Mvabea, was developed by Johnson & Johnson at its Janssen Pharmaceutical company. It was approved for medical use in the European Union in July 2020.

The regimen consists of two vaccine components (first vaccine as prime, followed by a second vaccine as boost) - the first based on AdVac technology from Crucell Holland B.V. (which is part of Janssen), the second based on the MVA-BN technology from Bavarian Nordic. The Ad26.ZEBOV is derived from human adenovirus serotype 26 (Ad26) expressing the Ebola virus Mayinga variant glycoprotein, while the second component MVA-BN is the Modified Vaccinia Virus Ankara – Bavarian Nordic (MVA-BN) Filo-vector. This product commenced Phase I clinical trial at the Jenner Institute in Oxford during January 2015. The preliminary data indicated the prime-boost vaccine regimen elicited temporary immunologic response in the volunteers as expected from vaccination.  The Phase II trial enrolled 612 adult volunteers and commenced in July 2015, in the United Kingdom and France.  A second Phase II trial, involving 1,200 volunteers, was initiated in Africa with the first trial commenced in Sierra Leone in October 2015.

In September 2019, the Committee for Medicinal Products for Human Use (CHMP) of the European Medicines Agency (EMA) granted an accelerated assessment to Janssen for Ad26.ZEBOV and MVA-BN-Filo, and in November 2019, Janssen submitted a Marketing Authorization Application (MAA) to the EMA for approval of Ad26.ZEBOV and MVA-BN-Filo.

In May 2020, the EMA CHMP recommended granting a marketing authorization for the combination of Ad26.ZEBOV (Zabdeno) and MVA-BN-Filo (Mvabea) vaccines. Zabdeno is given first and Mvabea is administered approximately eight weeks later as a booster. This prophylactic two-dose regimen is therefore not suitable for an outbreak response where immediate protection is necessary. As a precautionary measure for individuals at imminent risk of exposure to Ebola virus (for example healthcare professionals and those living in or visiting areas with an ongoing Ebola virus disease outbreak), an extra Zabdeno booster vaccination should be considered for individuals who completed the Zabdeno-Mvabea two-dose vaccination regimen more than four months ago. Efficacy for humans is not yet known as the efficacy has been extrapolated from animal studies.

Ad5-EBOV 
In late 2014 and early 2015,  a double-blind, randomized Phase I trial was conducted in the Jiangsu Province of China; the trial examined a vaccine that contains glycoproteins of the 2014 strain, rather than those of the 1976 strain. The trial found signals of efficacy and raised no significant safety concerns.

In 2017, the China Food and Drug Administration (CFDA) announced approval of an Ebola vaccine, co-developed by the Institute of Biotechnology of the Academy of Military Medical Sciences and the private vaccine-maker CanSino Biologics. It contains a human adenovirus serotype 5 vector (Ad5) with the glycoprotein gene from ZEBOV. Their findings were consistent with previous tests on rVSV-ZEBOV in Africa and Europe.

In development

cAd3-EBO Z 

In September 2014, two Phase I clinical trials began for the vaccine cAd3-EBO Z, which is based on an attenuated version of a chimpanzee adenovirus (cAd3) that has been genetically altered so that it is unable to replicate in humans. The cAd3 vector has a DNA fragment insert that encodes the Ebola virus glycoprotein, which is expressed on the virion surface and is critical for attachment to host cells and catalysis of membrane fusion. It was developed by NIAID in collaboration with Okairos, now a division of GlaxoSmithKline. For the trial designated VRC 20, 20 volunteers were recruited by the NIAID in Bethesda, Maryland, while three dose-specific groups of 20 volunteers each were recruited for trial EBL01 by University of Oxford, UK. Initial results were released in November 2014; all 20 volunteers developed antibodies against Ebola and there were no significant concerns raised about safety. In December 2014, University of Oxford expanded the trial to include a booster vaccine based on MVA-BN, a strain of Modified vaccinia Ankara, developed by Bavarian Nordic, to investigate whether it can help increase immune responses further.  The trial which has enrolled a total of 60 volunteers will see 30 volunteers vaccinated with the booster vaccine. , Phase III trial with a single dose of cAd3-EBO Z begins in Sierra Leone after a successful Phase 2 study in West Africa countries.

Ebola GP vaccine 

At the 8th Vaccine and ISV Conference in Philadelphia on 27−28 October 2014, Novavax Inc. reported the development in a "few weeks" of a glycoprotein (GP) nanoparticle Ebola virus (EBOV GP) vaccine using their proprietary recombinant technology. A recombinant protein is a protein whose code is carried by recombinant DNA. The vaccine is based on the newly published genetic sequence of the 2014 Guinea Ebola (Makona) strain that is responsible for the 2014 Ebola disease epidemic in West Africa.  In animal studies, a useful immune response was induced and was found to be enhanced ten to a hundred-fold by the company's "Matrix-M" immunologic adjuvant.  A study of the response of non-human primate to the vaccine had been initiated.  , Novavax had completed two primate studies on baboons and macaques and had initiated a Phase I clinical trial in Australia. The Lipid nanoparticle (LNP)-encapsulated siRNAs rapidly adapted to target the Makona outbreak strain of EBOV and are able to protect 100% of rhesus monkeys against lethal challenge when treatment was initiated at three days post-exposure while animals were viremic and clinically ill.
The top line Phase I human trial results showed that the adjuvanted Ebola GP Vaccine was highly immunogenic at all dose levels.

Nasal vaccine 
On 5 November 2014, the Houston Chronicle reported that a research team at the University of Texas-Austin was developing a nasal spray Ebola vaccine, which the team had been working on for seven years. The team reported in 2014, that in the nonhuman primate studies it conducted, the vaccine had more efficacy when delivered via nasal spray than by injection. , further development by the team appeared unlikely due to lack of funding.

Vaxart tablet 
Vaxart Inc. is developing a vaccine technology in the form of a temperature-stable tablet which may offer advantages such as reduced cold chain requirement, and rapid and scalable manufacturing. In January 2015, Vaxart announced that it had secured funding to develop its Ebola vaccine to Phase I trial.

Attenuated Ebola virus vaccine 
A study published in Science during March 2015, demonstrated that vaccination with a weakened form of the Ebola virus provides some measure of protection to non-human primates. This study was conducted in accordance with a protocol approved by an Institutional Animal Care and Use Committee of the National Institutes of Health. The new vaccine relies on a strain of Ebola called EBOVΔVP30, which is unable to replicate.

GamEvac-Combi 

A study published in Human Vaccines & Immunotherapeutics in March 2017, analyzing data from a clinical trial of the GamEvac-Combi vaccine in Russia, concluded said vaccine to be safe and effective and recommended proceeding to Phase III trials.

Prospects 
In September 2019, a study published in Cell Reports demonstrated the role of the Ebola virus VP35 protein in its immune evasion. A recombinant form of Ebola virus with a mutant VP35 protein (VP35m) was developed, and showed positive results in the activation of the RIG-I-like receptor signaling. Non-human primates were challenged with different doses of VP35. This challenge resulted in the activation of the innate immune system and the production of anti-EBOV antibodies. The primates were then back-challenged with the wild type Ebola virus and survived. This potentially creates a prospect for a future vaccine development.

Clinical trials in West Africa 
In January 2015,  Marie-Paule Kieny, the World Health Organization's (WHO) assistant director-general of health systems and innovation, announced that the vaccines cAd3-EBO Z and VSV-EBOV had demonstrated acceptable safety profiles during early testing and would soon progress to large-scale trials in Liberia, Sierra Leone, and Guinea. The trials would involve up to 27,000 people and comprise three groups – members of the first two groups would receive the two candidate vaccines, while the third group will receive a placebo.  Both vaccines have since successfully completed the Phase 2 studies.  The large scale Phase 3 studies have begun , in Liberia and Sierra Leone, and in Guinea in March 2016.

In addition, a medical anthropologist at Université de Montréal, had been working in Guinea and raised further questions about safety in the ring trial after spending time in April at one of the Ebola treatment units where trial participants are taken if they become ill, the centre in Coyah, about 50km from the capital of Conakry.

The Russian Foreign Ministry announced in 2016, the intention to conduct field trials of two Russian vaccines involving 2000 people. According to local media reports, the Guinean government authorized the commencement of the trials on 9 August 2017, at the Rusal-built Research and Diagnostic Center of Epidemiology and Microbiology in Kindia. The trials were slated to continue until 2018. As of October 2019, Russia licensed the vaccine by local regulatory authorities and was reportedly ready to ship vaccine to Africa.

U.S. national stockpile
In 2014, Credit Suisse estimated that the U.S. government will provide over $1billion in contracts to companies to develop medicine and vaccines for Ebola virus disease. Congress passed a law in 2004 that funds a national stockpile of vaccines and medicine for possible outbreaks of disease. A number of companies were expected to develop Ebola vaccines: GlaxoSmithKline, NewLink Genetics, Johnson & Johnson, and Bavarian Nordic. Another company, Emergent BioSolutions, was a contestant for manufacturing new doses of ZMapp, a drug for Ebola virus disease treatment originally developed by Mapp Biopharmaceutical. Supplies of ZMapp ran out in August 2014. In September 2014, the Biomedical Advanced Research and Development Authority (BARDA) entered into a multimillion-dollar contract with Mapp Biopharmaceutical to accelerate the development of ZMapp. Additional contracts were signed in 2017.

See also 
 Ebola virus disease
 Ebola virus disease treatment research

References

Further reading

External links

 
 
 

Breakthrough therapy
Ebola
Hemorrhagic fevers
Vaccines